The 1878 Rochester by-election was fought on 14 June 1878.  The byelection was fought due to the death of the incumbent Liberal MP, Philip Wykeham Martin.  It was won by the Liberal candidate Arthur Otway.

References

1878 in England
Rochester, Kent
1878 elections in the United Kingdom
By-elections to the Parliament of the United Kingdom in Kent constituencies
19th century in Kent